Chengzihe is a district of Jixi, Heilongjiang, People's Republic of China.

Administrative divisions
There are five subdistricts, one township, and one ethnic township in the district: 

Subdistricts:
Chengzihe Subdistrict, Chengxi Subdistrict, Zhengyang Subdistrict, Xinghua Subdistrict, Donghai Subdistrict

Townships:
Changqing Township, Yongfeng Korean Ethnic Township

References

External links

Administrative subdivisions of Heilongjiang